Europa Sports Park is a multi-purpose stadium in Gibraltar; it was previously a Ministry of Defence cricket pitch. In 2019 it hosted the Island Games opening ceremony and will also host the annual Gibraltar Music Festival.

The facility is home to the Gibraltar national rugby union team, as well as other sports such as cricket, darts, gymnastics, squash and more. The rugby uses the facility to host all their home national team games, as well as the training and match base for the four Gibraltar Rugby Football Union clubs: Ibex Buccaneers, the Rock Scorpions, the Straits Sharks and Europa Stormers who all play in the u-mee Gibraltar Rugby Championship. The recent addition of the Trusted Novus bank Youth rugby festival also increases the rugby offer for young people on the rock.

In February 2014 the Gibraltar Football Association had unveiled plans for a UEFA Category 4 multi-function stadium to be built on the site; however the following year this proposal was abandoned. Subsequently, the GFA purchased Victoria Stadium.

On 27 March 2021, Europa Sports Park was the venue for the WBC interim heavyweight championship rematch between Alexander Povetkin and Dillian Whyte.

Florence Nightingale Field Hospital
A COVID-19 field hospital was set up at the site, in line with those set up in the UK mainland.

See also
Football in Gibraltar
Sport in Gibraltar

References

Football venues in Gibraltar
Gibraltar
Multi-purpose stadiums
Sports venues in Gibraltar
Sports venues completed in 2019
Rugby union stadiums in Europe